refers to either of two Japanese actors:

Nakamura Kichiemon I (born 1886–1954)
Nakamura Kichiemon II (born 1944), the grandson and adopted son of Nakamura Kichiemon I